Alexander (Oleksandr) Voytovych (1971, Lviv)  is a Ukrainian contemporary artist. Figurative painting characterizes the majority of his work, and portrait and naked model painting are two main themes of his art.

Biography 
Alexander Voytovych was educated at L'viv Decorative and Applied Art College named after Iv. Trush and the Lviv National Academy of Arts
1994 "One for all", National Museum in L'viv, Ukraine
1995-1996 International Plein Airs, Budapest
1997-2000 Uzhgorod Picture Gallery, Ukraine, Uzhhorod
1998 "Art at the turn of millennia", Museum of Ethnography and Art Crafts NAS of Ukraine, L'viv
1999 The first author's project "Inspiratio" of art group "Polychrome" - visual penetration into the past and transformation in contemporary secret. The project generated considerable excitement and mixed reviews, Art-Cultural Center "Dzyga"
2000 Laureate of "Autumn salon" diptych by "objective reality" in collaboration with Ivanka Voytovych, L'viv Palace of Arts, Ukraine
 Lviv's portrait exhibition "Persona", L'viv Palace of Arts, Ukraine
2001 One-man exhibition "Capriccio…" —  grotesque eroticism against Galician conservatism, gallery "Gerdan", Lviv 
2002-2004 Exhibitions in Spain 
 Charity Project "Originales Solidarios", Barcelona-Valencia, Spain
 One-man exhibition, La Galeria de Soledad Arroyo Gill, Toledo, Spain
 Centro Municipal de las Artes de Alcorcon, Madrid
 Galeria Nova Rua, Lugo
 I PREMIO INTERNACIONAL de ARTES PLASTICAS "Aires de Cordoba", a prize drawing  and One-man exhibition  in the gallery "Aires de Cordoba", Córdoba, Spain
2003 One-man exhibition "Women’s whims", Budapest, Hungary
 "Absinthe  and Absence - a sweet Taste of Decadence" Art-Cultural Center "Soviart", Kyiv, Ukraine
2003-2006 Exhibitions in Poland
 "Lemkowskie Jeruzalem", Gorlice — Kraków — Wrocław
 International Triennial of Painting "Silver Square",  Przemyśl
 "Lwowskie klimaty", gallery BWA, Kielce

2004 Erotic Art Exhibition "Apple from Eva", gallery "Uzhgorod", Uzhgorod, Ukraine
 Minoritenkloster, Tulln, Austria
2005 PREMIO WEB COLOR 2005, award in the category painting, gallery "Kleinos", Italy
 Project Gallery Antiquity "Three crowns", Lviv — Kyiv
2006 Together with the poet Alexander Gavrosh edition of poetry collection "A BODY OF AN ARCHERESS", is an attempt to recreate a myth about a perfect Woman with man's hands – hands of a poet Alexander Gavrosh and an artist Alexander Voytovych
2006-2009 A series of personal art projects
 "Allegory on high heels", gallery "Green sofa", Lviv
 "ECSTASY Exiting daily routine" — sacrality appeal to the idea that the body is experiencing ecstasy and attempt to understand the nature of ecstasy,  Museum of ideas, Lviv
 " Salome is not only…Kyiv Academic Young Theatre
 "Noble Entertaining In Ten Portraits" - find the perfect female image through the noble identity, Museum of ideas, Lviv
 "Things from Lviv", gallery "Silver Bells", Kyiv
2007-2008 The idea and organization of erotic art projects "Taming Eros" - male and female format, gallery "Green Sofa", Lviv
 "Grotesque in modern art", Museum of Ethnography and Art Crafts NAS of Ukraine, L'viv
 "My Lviv", Center for Urban History of East Central Europe, Lviv
 "Art — Kyiv", Ukrainian House, Kyiv
2009 Open their own gallery "Art Atelier Voytovych" Lviv presenting collections of paintings, drawings and decors from Ivanka and Alexander Voytovych 
 Exhibition of Contemporary Ukrainian Art Bucharest, Embassy of Ukraine, Romania
 "НюАнс", L'viv Palace of Arts, Ukraine
2009-2010 International Plein Airs in Hungary, Balatonföldvár and Vac
2010 One-man exhibitions 
 "КаvART",  "Svit kavy", Lviv
 " A Mysterious Portrait", Art Atelier Voytovych, Lviv

References

Bibliography
 International Painting Triennial of Carpathian Region Silver Quadrangle. — Przemyśl: San-Set, 2006 — P. 86. 
 Ivanka és Alexander Voytovics festőművész család // Fészekrakó. — 2003. —III.évfolyam 1.szám — P. 3, 58–59. HU 
 Voytovych trae an Aires sus elegantes figuras // Diario Córdoba. — 2004. — 18 de septiembre. — p. 54.
 Bodnar O./Боднар О. — Л. Тайна втілення. — Ужгород: Карпати, 2009. — P. 237–239. — fоtо: p. 227, 270.
 Gavrosh A./Гаврош О. Тіло лучниці. — Л.:Піраміда, 2006. — 56 с. — Ілюстрації: О.Войтович. 
 Didyk N./Дідик Н. Fundamentals of composition. — Ужгород: Мистецька лінія, 2009. — С.44. 
 Kosmolinska N./Космолінська Н. Art chat on "Green sofa" // FINE ART. — 2009. — No. 4. — P. 114 — 115.
 Chervatiuk L./Черватюк Л. Women's image in the Ukrainian modern art. — К.: Навчальна книга, 2007. — P. 33 — 34.
 Shumylovych B./Шумилович Б. Women, paintings and allegories in high heels. // Образотворче мистецтво. — 2008. — No. 4. — P. 92 — 93.

External links

Center for Urban History of East Central Europe
Alexander Voytovych: "Woman as body"
Award in Project "VESELKA"
Opening the exhibition of Ukrainian artists
Nude in lunar halo
Modern art classics as preparation
"Noble Entertaining In Ten Portraits" Alexander Voytovych
The Temptation of Saint Antony

Ukrainian painters
Ukrainian male painters
Artists from Lviv
Contemporary painters
1971 births
Living people